Mohamed Harrat (born October 25, 1976 in Algiers) is an Algerian footballer. He currently plays as a defender for CR Belouizdad in the Algerian league.

Football career
 2005-2007 Paradou AC 
 2007-2008 JSM Chéraga
 2008-pres. CR Belouizdad

External links
 DZFoot Profile

1976 births
Algerian footballers
Living people
Footballers from Algiers
CR Belouizdad players
Paradou AC players
JSM Chéraga players
Association football defenders
21st-century Algerian people